Parage is a village located in the Bačka Palanka municipality, in the South Bačka District of Serbia. It is situated in the Autonomous Province of Vojvodina. The village has a Serb ethnic majority and its population numbering 1,039 people (2002 census).

Name
In Serbian, the village is known as Parage (Параге), in Croatian as Parage, and in Hungarian as  Parrag.

History
Since its foundation, the village was mainly inhabited by Serbs. First historical source citing Parage dates back to 1473. At the end of 18th century village with entire population was moved 4 km to north, due to high ground-water levels, but also to make space for expansion of Gajdobra, place colonised with Germans by Austrian monarchy.

Historical population

Trivia
Prominent Serbian national songs author from 19th century, Filip Višnjić is said to have been visited Parage in 1812.
Railroad connecting Novi Sad and Sombor was made near Parage in 1890.

Notable natives/residents
Charles Alverson, British-American writer spent almost a decade living in Parage, before moving to Belgrade
Miodrag Radulovacki, Professor of Pharmacology in the College of Medicine at the University of Illinois-Chicago

References
Slobodan Ćurčić, Broj stanovnika Vojvodine, Novi Sad, 1996.
Dušan N. Petrović, Parage - selo u Bačkoj, Novi Sad, 2004.

See also
List of places in Serbia
List of cities, towns and villages in Vojvodina

Bačka Palanka
Places in Bačka
South Bačka District